Lapeirousia is a genus in the plant family Iridaceae. It is endemic to sub-Saharan Africa, about a third of the species occurring in fynbos.

Origin of genus name
The genus Lapeirousia was described by Pierre André Pourret in Mém. Acad. Sci. Toulouse 3 : 79 (1788); Bak. In FC. 6 : 88 (1896) in part; Goldblatt in Contrib. Bol. Herb. 4 : 1 (1972); Sölch & Roessl. in FSWA. 155 : 6 (1969). Chasmatocallis Foster in Contrib. Gray Herb. 127 : 40 (1939). He named the genus in honour of his friend, the botanist Philippe-Isidore Picot de Lapeyrouse. The inconsistent spellings of that name no doubt led to the original genus name being spelt "Lapeirousia" and contributed to various subsequent misspellings of the genus in various reference sources, notably "Lapeyrousia". There also has been confusion leading to unfounded claims that the genus was named after the French mariner Jean-François de Galaup, comte de Lapérouse, who had nothing substantial to do with matters botanical, and was unrelated to de Lapeyrouse.

Description
Lapeirousia  are cormous plants, usually small, and bearing deciduous leaves. The corms are small, campanulate to triangular in outline, and flat-based. The tunics comprise hard, woody layers, of which the innermost layers are entire. The leaves are basal, often solitary. They may be plane and falcate, or linear and ribbed. Various forms of scape occur; they may be either subterranean or aerial, and simple or branched. The inflorescence is a spike, sometimes contracted and fasciculate or a corymbose panicle. There are firm, green bracts, either small and subequal, or with the outer bract very large, often keeled, crisped and ribbed. The perianth may be either actinomorphic or zygomorphic; the tube short or very long. It might be slender and cylindrical, adapted to pollination by long-tongued flies, or it might be funnel-shaped. The flowers' lobes may be subequal and spreading, or unequal with upper largest petals erect, the lower three forming a lip. The stamens are symmetrically arranged. The fruit is a membranous capsule containing many small seeds, either globose or angled by pressure.

Distribution
About 26 species have been described from Southern Africa, of which about a third are endemic to fynbos. Common names are various and regional, including painted petals, cabong, chabi,  (Afrikaans for "wheat flower"). The flowers are commonly scented, though possibly only at certain times of day.

 Lapeirousia anceps (L.f.) Ker Gawl.
 Lapeirousia angustifolia Schltr.
 Lapeirousia arenicola Schltr.
 Lapeirousia barklyi Baker
 Lapeirousia divaricata Baker
 Lapeirousia dolomitica Dinter
 Lapeirousia exilis Goldblatt
 Lapeirousia fabricii (D.Delaroche) Ker Gawl.
 Lapeirousia jacquinii N.E.Br.
 Lapeirousia kalahariensis Goldblatt & J.C.Manning
 Lapeirousia kamiesmontana Goldblatt & J.C.Manning
 Lapeirousia littoralis Baker
 Lapeirousia macrospatha Baker
 Lapeirousia montana Klatt
 Lapeirousia odoratissima Baker
 Lapeirousia oreogena Schltr. ex Goldblatt
 Lapeirousia plicata (Jacq.) Diels
 Lapeirousia purpurascens Goldblatt & J.C.Manning
 Lapeirousia purpurea Goldblatt & J.C.Manning
 Lapeirousia pyramidalis (Lam.) Goldblatt
 Lapeirousia silenoides (Jacq.) Ker Gawl.
 Lapeirousia simulans Goldblatt & J.C.Manning
 Lapeirousia spinosa (Goldblatt) Goldblatt & J.C.Manning
 Lapeirousia tenuis (Goldblatt) Goldblatt & J.C.Manning
 Lapeirousia verecunda Goldblatt
 Lapeirousia violacea Goldblatt

Traditional and current relevance
The plants are of considerable biological and evolutionary interest because of their adaptions to particular pollinators, such as flies in the families Tabanidae, Acroceridae, Bombyliidae, and most spectacularly, Nemestrinidae.

Though most species of Lapeirousia are not showy, they are elegant and often fragrant. Collectors of fynbos plants value them.

The corms of several species were important sources of food for early hunter-gatherers. The vernacular names cabong or chabi are derived from Khoisan names for the plants.

Gallery

References

Iridaceae genera
Iridaceae